The Reason is the second studio album by rapper Beanie Sigel. It was released on Roc-A-Fella Records on June 26, 2001. The album contains 14 tracks, and special guests include  Memphis Bleek, Jay-Z, Freeway, Omillio Sparks, Scarface, Daz, Kurupt, and Rell.
It received positive reviews from critics divided over Sigel's lyrical abilities as a rapper. The Reason debuted at number five on the Billboard 200 and spawned two singles: "Beanie (Mack Bitch)" and "Think It's a Game".

Reception

Critical reception 

The Reason garnered positive reviews from music critics who commended the record's East Coast production but questioned Sigel's abilities as a credible rapper. Andy Capper of NME found some familiarity in the album's beats but praised Sigel's dark-yet-intriguing delivery along with a talented list of guest artists, calling it "one of the best hardcore rap records of the year 2001." Steve 'Flash' Juon of RapReviews praised the lyrical delivery and production for being an upgrade from Sigel's debut effort The Truth, saying that, "[I]n the pantheon of Philadelphia rap from The Roots to Will Smith, make room for a mack (bitch) - he's definitely earned his right to shine." Entertainment Weeklys Evan Serpick said that, "Sigel will never sound as urgent as Chuck D or as smooth as Method Man, but the Jay-Z protégé makes up for it with smarter-than-average gangsta lyrics and eclectic hip-hop beats." Nick Catucci of Blender wrote that, "Throughout the disc, Beanie stalks through the subdued bounce of big, loose piano and horn riffs, his smooth but steely flow intact. There's a sequel to his first album's not-so-pretty prison tale "What Ya Life Like" here, but it's best hearing about Beans's life when he's feeling nice, not nasty."

AllMusic writer Bret Love commended the production for remaining consistent and Sigel's persona of a street smart hustler but found it running its course as the album continued, concluding that "Sigel's sophomore effort isn't so much an artistic step forward as it is a step sideways." HipHopDX writer Affrikka said that despite the first two tracks, the record starts to fall off into mediocre un-originality, saying that "Overall, the experience leaves you wanting more from the executive producing credit that Jay-Z takes. It’s almost as if anyone involved in this project expected listeners to not get past the first couple songs." Soren Baker, writing for the Los Angeles Times, commented that "[T]he normally assertive and interesting Philadelphia rapper flows like a sloth on nearly every cut of his second album, failing to elicit much excitement despite the solid, hard-core production." Robert Christgau graded the album as a "dud", indicating "a bad record whose details rarely merit further thought."

Commercial performance 
The Reason debuted at number five on the Billboard 200 selling 151,000 copies in its first week. On its second week, it dropped to number 11 with sales dropping 50% to 50,000 copies.

Track listing

Samples
Nothing Like It
"Ain’t Nothing Like The Real Thing" by The Dynamic Superiors
So What You Saying
"If It Don’t Turn You One" by B.T. Express
”One Nation Under a Groove” by George Clinton
"Fairplay" by Soul II Soul
Get Down
"Lost Man” by Quincy Jones
"Bumpin' Bus Stop" by Thunder & Lightning
Man's World
"It’s A Man’s, Man’s, Man’s World" by James Brown
Mom Praying
"It Ain’t Gonna Rain On Nobody’s Parade But Mine" by The Dramatics
Still Got Love For You
"Ike’s Mood 1" by Isaac Hayes
What Your Life Like 2
"Quasimodo’s Marriage" by Alec R. Costandinos and The Syncophonic Orchestra
Think It's A Game
"Beth & Me" by Betty Wright

Personnel
Credits for The Reason adapted from AllMusic.
Kamel Abdo – engineer
Tony Dawsey – mastering
DJ Scratch – scratching
Just Blaze – mixing
Gimel "Young Guru" Keaton – engineer, mixing
Jonathan Mannion – photography
Midnite – assistant
Joe Quinde – mixing
Tony Vanias – recording coordinator
Doug Wilson – mixing

Charts

Weekly charts

Year-end charts

Singles chart positions

Album/Singles Awards
BET Awards 2001
Album of the Year: Beanie Sigel, "The Reason"

References

2001 albums
Beanie Sigel albums
Def Jam Recordings albums
Roc-A-Fella Records albums
Albums produced by 88-Keys
Albums produced by Just Blaze
Albums produced by No I.D.
Albums produced by Rick Rock
Albums produced by Kanye West